Richard Macaulay Ivey,  (October 26, 1925 – December 28, 2019) was a Canadian lawyer and philanthropist.

Born in London, Ontario, he attended Ridley College in St. Catharines, Ontario, and received an Honours Business Administration (HBA) degree from the University of Western Ontario in 1947. While attending UWO, Ivey was a member of the Delta Upsilon fraternity, graduating in the same class as his successor as Chancellor, David B. Weldon. Richard M. served as chancellor from 1980 to 1984, while his father, Richard G. served as chancellor from 1955 to 1961.

In 1947, he founded with his father, Richard G. Ivey, the Richard Ivey Foundation, a private charitable foundation located in Toronto, which had assets of over CAD $62 million in 2002 and has given away over CAD $56 million. In 1988, he was made a Member of the Order of Canada and was promoted twice: to Officer in 1994 and Companion in 2000.

References

1925 births
2019 deaths
Canadian philanthropists
Chancellors of the University of Western Ontario
Companions of the Order of Canada
University of Western Ontario alumni
People from London, Ontario
Ridley College alumni
20th-century philanthropists